Ablaberoides dentilabris is a species of beetles in the family Melolonthidae. It is found in Africa, and was discovered by J. W. van Lansberge in 1886.

References

Melolonthinae